Samuel James Lawn (29 May 1906 – 25 May 1971) was an Australian politician who represented the South Australian House of Assembly seat of Adelaide for the Labor Party from 1950 to 1971.

References

1906 births
1971 deaths
Members of the South Australian House of Assembly
Australian Labor Party members of the Parliament of South Australia
20th-century Australian politicians